Dust or Polish? (1950) is a novel by Australian writer and artist Norman Lindsay.

Story outline
The novel tells the story of ex-chorus girl Rita Aanson who goes into the second-hand furniture trade in the Sydney suburb of Paddington.

Critical reception
Reviewing the novel in The Argus Gladys Hain noted a technique of Lindsay's: "Although Norman Lindsay's Dust Or Polish is a quite well-knit story, it will hold the interest rather because of the author's little habit of putting his views on art – and artists – into the mouths of his characters, than because of any intrinsic merit as a literary effort."

In The Sydney Morning Herald, the reviewer was full of praise: "Norman Lindsay's latest novel (his tenth) is a lively, vigorous work sprinkled with the wisdom and keen observations of a mature thinker, and written with the technical skill of an artist. The characters are vitally projected, the narrative flows smoothly and the novel is full of shrewd and thoughtful comments on art, life, manners, morals and, of course, the
second-hand and period furniture business that provides an interesting background."

Television adaptation

The novel was adapted for television in 1972.  The television movie was directed by Julian Pringle, from a script by Peter Kenna, and featured Arthur Dignam, Sandy Gore, and Barbara Stephens. The drama was broadcast on the Australian Broadcasting Corporation in October 1972. It was part of a series of adaptations of Norman Lindsay works.

Cast
Arthur Dignam
Sandy Gore
Barbara Stephens
Marion Edward

See also
 1950 in Australian literature

References

External links
1972 TV adaptation at AustLit
Complete copy of script for 1972 TV version at National Archives of Australia

1950 Australian novels
Novels set in Sydney
Paddington, New South Wales
Angus & Robertson books
Novels by Norman Lindsay